Love of Life is the eighth studio album by American experimental rock band Swans. It was released in 1992 on Young God Records.

Background 
Like its predecessor, White Light from the Mouth of Infinity, Love of Life was out of print for a long time and had not been reissued until December 2015. Six of the eleven songs appear on the Various Failures compilation, and a further four appear on the Forever Burned compilation. These two compilations therefore contain all the material on this release, except the Jarboe composition "She Cries (For Spider)", as well as tracks 1 and 9.

The cover art is a painting by Deryk Thomas. All of the untitled segues, listed as both "(—)" and "(---)", are credited to the band Beautiful People LTD, which is a one-off collaboration between Jarboe and then-Swans bass player Lary 7.

Critical reception 

Trouser Press wrote, "Not as stunning in its passion as the band's best work, Love of Life is still an often beautiful, haunting record." AllMusic wrote, "Love of Life unsurprisingly proves to be yet another Swans masterpiece."

Track listing

Personnel 

 Michael Gira – vocals, guitar, acoustic guitar, samples, production, sleeve artwork concept and design
 Jarboe – vocals, keyboards, backing vocals, mellotron
 Clinton Steele – guitar, acoustic guitar
 Algis Kizys – bass guitar
 Vincent Signorelli – drums
 Jenny Wade – bass
 Ted Parsons – drums
 Troy Gregory – bass guitar
 Larry Seven – bass guitar, guitar
 Adam Jankowski – narration on "Identity"
 Martin Bisi – engineering, additional programming
 Howie Weinberg – mastering
 Mark Richardson – additional recording
 Deryk Thomas – front cover illustration
 Larry Lame – sleeve photography
 Patricia Mooney – sleeve artwork and layout

References

External links 

 

1992 albums
Swans (band) albums
Young God Records albums
Albums produced by Michael Gira